Mallus may refer to:

Mallus (Cilicia), an ancient city in Cilicia, Anatolia
Mallus (Pisidia), an ancient city in Pisidia, Anatolia
Mallus (Legends of Tomorrow), a mysterious entity in the American superhero television series
Marco Mallus (born 1982), Italian footballer

Other uses
Crates of Mallus, Greek grammarian and philosopher
Miletus mallus, a butterfly in the family Lycaenidae

See also
Malus (disambiguation)